Kemps Creek is a creek located in Sydney, Australia. It is a tributary of South Creek which flows into the Hawkesbury River. The source of the creek is about 2 km east by north of Catherine Field and flows in a roughly northerly direction through the suburbs of Austral (where it joins with its tributary Bonds Creek) and Kemps Creek (where, after approximately 17 km, it enters South Creek).

References

Creeks and canals of Sydney